Cascante is a town and municipality located in the province and autonomous community of Navarre, northern Spain.

During the Roman period, Cascante was known as Cascantum.

Notable people 
 Kike Sola, footballer
 Álex Remiro, footballer
 Lucio Urtubia, anarchist

References

External links
Ayuntamiento de Cascante
 CASCANTE in the Bernardo Estornés Lasa - Auñamendi Encyclopedia (Euskomedia Fundazioa) 

Municipalities in Navarre